Jeff Tyzik (born August 1, 1951) is an American conductor, arranger, and trumpeter. He has recorded jazz albums as a soloist and arranged pop and jazz music for orchestras.

Early life and education
Tyzik, born in Hyde Park, New York, started playing cornet at age nine, after being inspired by the buglers in an Independence Day parade in nearby Poughkeepsie. He switched to trumpet at age 11. He attended the Eastman School of Music in Rochester, earning Bachelor of Music (1973) and Master of Music (1977) degrees.

Career
While at Eastman, Tyzik met Chuck Mangione, a flugelhornist from Rochester who was teaching at the school. He worked with Mangione between 1973 and 1980 as lead trumpeter in Mangione's band and as co-producer of four albums. Tyzik also began to collaborate with Doc Severinsen, when Severinsen brought him to London to work on two albums with the Royal Philharmonic Orchestra.

Tyzik recorded six albums as a solo trumpeter between 1981 and 1990, appearing on Capitol, Polydor, and Amherst Records. He performed in Rochester with his big band in the late 1980s and early 1990s. He worked as arranger and record producer for Severinsen and The Tonight Show Band. Tyzik won a Grammy Award in 1987 for producing the 1986 album The Tonight Show Band with Doc Severinsen. Tyzik has arranged music and produced records for Maynard Ferguson and for the Woody Herman Orchestra.

Rochester Philharmonic 
The Rochester Philharmonic Orchestra approached Tyzik and Allen Vizzutti (a friend of Tyzik's from Eastman) in 1983 about creating a pops program for the orchestra. The pair spent the next decade working with orchestras around the country on similar programs. In 1994, Tyzik was named Principal Pops Conductor of the Rochester Philharmonic Orchestra. He has also conducted the Vancouver Symphony Orchestra, Winnipeg Symphony Orchestra, and the Brass Band of Battle Creek.

He is the Principal Pops Conductor of the Oregon Symphony, Vancouver Symphony Orchestra, The Florida Orchestra, Detroit Symphony Orchestra and the Seattle Symphony.

Publisher G. Schirmer commissioned Tyzik to arrange some of Duke Ellington's jazz suites for orchestra, including Black, Brown and Beige and The Nutcracker Suite. The Royal Philharmonic, the Cincinnati Pops Orchestra, and the Summit Brass have recorded music arranged or composed by Tyzik. He premiered his Concerto for Trombone and Orchestra his wind ensemble orchestration of the same piece with the Eastman Wind Ensemble at Carnegie Hall.

A recording by the RPO, with Tyzik conducting George Gershwin's Piano Concerto in F, Rhapsody in Blue, and Cuban Overture, peaked at No. 3 on the Billboard magazine classical chart. The album was released on May 8, 2007 by Harmonia Mundi.

Discography
 Farthest Corner of My Mind (independent, 1979)
 Prophecy (independent, 1980)
 Radiance (Capitol, 1982)
 Jammin' in Manhattan (Polydor, 1984)
 Smile (Polydor, 1985)
 Distant Dreams (Amherst, 1990)

References

Jeff Tyzik at KUTE

External links
 Official site

Living people
1951 births
Musicians from Rochester, New York
People from Hyde Park, New York
Jazz musicians from New York (state)
American conductors (music)
American male conductors (music)
American jazz trumpeters
American male trumpeters
American jazz bandleaders
Grammy Award winners
Eastman School of Music alumni
American male jazz musicians